Thomas Whitfield (born 30 November 1981) is a British/German biochemist and entrepreneur. He is known for the dietary supplement TRX2 and his work on DesignTheTime.com.

Biography
Thomas Whitfield was born in Kirkcaldy, Scotland. He spent his childhood and early schooling in Germany as his mother is German. He holds a DPhil (PhD) in Biochemistry from Christ Church, University of Oxford.
Being an Idea Idol of University of Oxford, he was selected as one of the 2009 Flying Start Global Entrepreneurs by the National Council for Graduate Entrepreneurship (NCGE) of Department for Business, Innovation and Skills (BIS), UK. In 2009 he was selected as a Kauffman Foundation Global Scholar.

Business Ventures

Designthetime.com (Miomi.com)
He was a co-founder and director of DesignTheTime.com") (later called Miomi.com) which plots user-generated personal histories. The website attracted vast media attention throughout Europe and was ranked as one of the Top 10 UK Web 2.0 startups in 2007 with co-operation agreements including Microsoft, Wikipedia (Wikimedia Foundation), Brockhaus and the British Library. Despite its popularity the website went offline in 2008 for unknown reasons.

Oxfords Biolabs and TRX2
In 2009 Whitfield founded the company Oxford Biolabs. In 2011 its first product TRX2 (trichos=hair in ancient Greek; 2=second generation), a dietary supplement became publicly available.

Coverage in Popular Media
Work of Whitfield has been featured in The Daily Telegraph several times, as well as in The Observer, CNN, New Scientist, Der Spiegel, RTL and Tagesschau In 2007 he has been featured during the Google Zeitgeist Entrepreneur of the Year conference.

See also
 Oxford BioLabs

References

External links
 oxfordbiolabs.com, Oxford BioLabs Official Website
 oxfordbiolabs.com/collections/trx2, TRX2 Official Website

Scottish businesspeople
Living people
1981 births
Alumni of Christ Church, Oxford
People from Kirkcaldy